is a Japanese music group formed in 1996. As of March 2021, the lineup consists of Shigeru Kishida and Masashi Sato. Their music is produced and distributed by Victor Entertainment.

Career 
After meeting at "Rock Commune," Ritsumeikan University's music club, Shigeru Kishida, Masashi Satō, and Nobuyuki Mori formed the original three-piece band.  The name "Quruli," an onomatopoeic word expressing rotation, was taken from a sign in the Kyoto Municipal Subway. In October 1998, Quruli released the single  on Victor Entertainment. They released their first major label album,   in 1999.

Quruli released the albums  in 2000, produced by Jim O'Rourke, and Team Rock in 2001.  According to music critic Ian Martin, Picture Book remains one of the most frequently cited influences for Japanese alt-rock bands.  During the production of the 2001 film The World is Mine, Quruli added guitarist Tasshin Ōmura to its lineup. In 2002, Mori left the band.

After working with a number of session drummers, Quruli officially added drummer Christopher McGuire to their lineup in November 2003. In 2003, HMV Records Japan rated Quruli No. 74 in their "Top 100 Japanese pops Artists".

In 2004 Quruli released the album . After the tour for the album was completed, Christopher McGuire left the group. 2005 saw the release of several Quruli singles along with a new album, Nikki, released in December of that year. At the last day of 2006, Tasshin Ōmura left the band. In 2007 Quruli released a new album, recorded in Vienna with the Ambassade Orchester Wien. They joined forces again in 2008 to put out the live album Philharmonic or die.

Quruli first appeared on television performing  on NHK. On September 9, 2005, Quruli appeared on the popular "Music Station" program and performed their song, . The song was also featured as the theme song to a Keikyu commercial.

On May 26, 2010, Quruli released the B-side compilation , which also included their new song . The album reached No. 1 on the Oricon weekly album charts, becoming their first No. 1 album on the charts.

In 2014, those songs were compiled into .

Quruli released the 10th album  in 2012, the 11th album THE PIER in 2014, and the 12th album  in 2018.

In 2020, Quruli released their 20th album, ”thaw".

Members

Current members

 (born April 27, 1976, vocals, electric guitar), was born in Kyoto, and is Quruli's primary songwriter and leader of the band.
 (born February 1, 1977, bass guitar, was born in Kameoka, Kyoto. Besides his musical duties, he also serves as the president of Quruli's label, Noise McCartney Records. For most of his career, Satō used a Fender Jazz Bass, but during the recording of Quruli's Antenna album, switched to a Fender Precision Bass.

Former members
 (born June 20, 1975-, drums) 1996–2002
Christopher McGuire (born November 28, 1975, drums) 2003–2004
 (born December 17, 1975), electric guitar), is from Hyōgo Prefecture. He uses a Flying-V guitar. It was announced on February 26, 2007, that Ohmura had quit the band.
 (born October 28, 1980-, drums) 2011
 (born March 14, 1980-, electric guitar) 2011-2013
 (born February 13, 1985, trumpet, electronic keyboard), was born in Maizuru, Kyoto. 2011-2015,2017-2021 (2015-2017:maternity leave)

Supporting musicians
Takefumi Tsujimura (guitar)
Ahito Inazawa (drum set)
Taro Dai (drum set, percussion)
Hirohisa Horie (keyboards, guitar)
Cliff Almond (drum set)
Takashi Numazawa (drum set)
Yuya Kikuchi (drum set)
Soichiro Yamauchi (guitar) 
Satoshi Mishiba (piano)
Yuko Araki (drum set)
Carwyn Ellis (keyboards, guitar, banjo, bouzouki, piano) 
Ren Takada (guitar) (special guest during their Fuji Rock 2011 performance)
Daiki Matsumoto (guitar) current member
Shun Ishiwaka (drums, piano) current member
Yasuhiro Nozaki (keyboards) current member

Discography

Albums 
  (indies; November 21, 1997)
  (indies; May 15, 1998)
  (April 21, 1999)
  (January 21, 2000)
 Team Rock (February 21, 2001)
 The World Is Mine (March 20, 2002)
  (soundtrack; November 5, 2003)
  (March 10, 2004)
 NIKKI (November 23, 2005)
  (best album; July 26, 2006)
  (June 27, 2007)
 Philharmonic or Die (live album; February 20, 2008)
  (June 6, 2009)
  (coupling best album; May 26, 2010)
  (September 8, 2010)
  (best album; June 29, 2011)
  (soundtrack; November 9, 2011)
  (September 19, 2012)
 THE PIER (September 17, 2014)
  (compilation album; December 17, 2014)
  (extended play; July 26, 2016)
  (best album; September 14, 2016)
  (September 18, 2018)
 thaw (April 15th, 2020)
  (April 28th, 2021)

Singles 
  (1998)
  (1999)
  (1999)
  (1999)
  (2000)
  (2000)
  (2001)
  (2001)
  (2002)
  (2002)
 "How To Go" (2003)
  (2003)
  (2004)
 "Birthday" (2005)
 "Superstar" (2005)
  (2005)
 "Baby I Love You" (2005)
 "Juice" (feat. Rip Slyme; 2006)
 "Jubilee" (2007)
  (2007)
  (2008)
  (2009)
  (2009)
  (duet with Matsutōya Yumi; 2009) 
  (2010)
  (2011)
 "everybody feels the same" (2012)
 "Remember Me" (2013)
  (2013)
 "There is (always light)/Liberty & Gravity - Special Edition -" (2014)
  (2015)
 "How Can I Do?" (included in Live Blu-ray/DVD, ; 2017)
  (2018)
 Sampo (2019)
 Takarasagashi (2022)
 In my pocket (2022)
 August(2022)
 Midsummer (2022)

References

External links
 
Quruli official MySpace page
HMV Japan "Top 100 Japanese pops Artists" (in Japanese)
Ambassade Orchester official website

Japanese rock music groups
Japanese alternative rock groups
Musical groups established in 1996
Victor Entertainment artists
Musical groups from Kyoto Prefecture